The American Academy of Cardiovascular Perfusion is a professional association which lists as its purpose "to encourage and stimulate investigation and study which will increase the knowledge of cardiovascular perfusion, to correlate and disseminate such knowledge." The organization was founded in 1979.

References

Medical associations based in the United States
Heart disease organizations